Allium altissimum, the tall onion, is a species of flowering plant in the family Amaryllidaceae, native to Central Asia, Iran, and Afghanistan. Its best-known cultivar is 'Goliath'.

References

altissimum
Garden plants of Asia
Flora of Central Asia
Flora of Iran
Flora of Afghanistan
Plants described in 1884